Lida Junction Airport  is a public use airport located 14 nautical miles (16 mi, 26 km) south of the central business district of Goldfield, in Esmeralda County, Nevada, United States. The airport is owned by the United States Bureau of Land Management.

History 
The runway was built to provide access to the Kit Cat Ranch.  It sits adjacent to the former Cottontail Ranch.

Facilities 

References

External links 
 
 Aerial image as of May 1994 from USGS The National Map
 

Airports in Nevada
Transportation in Esmeralda County, Nevada
Bureau of Land Management